The Easy Way is a 2008 French heist film directed by Jean-Paul Rouve, who also stars in the titular role as the real life thief Albert Spaggiari, who organized a break-in into a Société Générale bank in Nice, France in 1976. The original French title refers to the note Albert Spaggiari left in the bank after completing the robbery.

Part of the movie was shot in Portugal at the Hotel Palácio Estoril, a 5-star hotel where some scenes of the James Bond film On Her Majesty's Secret Service were also shot.

Plot
In 1977 in Nice, Albert Spaggiari is arrested by the police and brought to a judge's office for interrogation, but he manages to escape by jumping out of the window and riding off on a motorcycle with an accomplice. He travels to South America where he meets new faces including a mysterious journalist who wants to interview him about the heist and his whereabouts.

Cast
 Jean-Paul Rouve as Albert Spaggiari
 Alice Taglioni as Julia
 Gilles Lellouche as Vincent Goumard
 Florence Loiret Caille as Nathalie Goumard
 Patrick Bosso as The gangster
 Anne Marivin as The cop
 Pom Klementieff as NHI
 Gérard Depardieu as The godfather

See also
Les Égouts du paradis (1979)
The Great Riviera Bank Robbery (1979)

References

External links
 

2008 films
French drama films
2000s French-language films
Biographical films about French gangsters
Films directed by Jean-Paul Rouve
Société Générale
French heist films
2000s heist films
2000s French films